Mohamed-Iqbal Ravalia (born August 15, 1957) is a Canadian senator from Newfoundland and Labrador. He was appointed to the Senate on June 1, 2018.

Ravalia left white minority rule in what was then Rhodesia and immigrated to rural Newfoundland. He holds a bachelor of medicine and bachelor of surgery from the University of Rhodesia, in present-day Zimbabwe.

Prior to his appointment to the Senate, Ravalia was a family physician, as well as a senior medical officer at the Notre Dame Bay Memorial Health Centre, in Twillingate, NL. He was also an associate professor of family medicine and the assistant dean of Rural Medical Education Network at Memorial University of Newfoundland.

He has been awarded the Canadian Family Physician of the Year Award and received the Order of Canada in 2016. In 2012, he was awarded the Queen's Diamond Jubilee Medal.

Ravalia and his wife Dianne have two sons, Adam and Mikhail.

References

External links
 

Living people
1957 births
Canadian senators from Newfoundland and Labrador
Independent Senators Group
21st-century Canadian politicians
Rhodesian emigrants to Canada
Canadian politicians of Indian descent